The International Aerospace Quality Group (IAQG) is a cooperative global organization of companies providing aviation, space and defense products and services.

The IAQG is committed to achieve significant performance improvements through the development of standards, industry oversight and guidance materials for use throughout the supply chain.

The IAQG is sponsored by three bodies:
 SAE (Society of Automotive Engineers)
 ASD (Aerospace and Defense Industries Association of Europe)
 SJAC (Society of Japanese Aerospace Companies)

And comprises three Sectors:
 Americas (AAQG) – North, Central & South America
 Europe (EAQG) - Europe, Middle East, Russia & Africa
 Asia-Pacific (APAQG) - Asia and Oceania

External links 
 International Aerospace Quality Group – Official website

Aerospace engineering organizations
Standards organisations in Belgium